The 16th Irish Film & Television Academy Awards took place on 18 October 2020. Because no ceremony was held in 2019, this ceremony honoured films and television drama released in both 2018 and 2019. Due to the COVID-19 pandemic, no physical ceremony took place; instead, there was a "virtual ceremony" hosted by Deirdre O’Kane.

The nominations for the IFTAs were announced by the Irish Film and Television Academy on 14 July 2020. People presenting awards included President Michael D. Higgins, Martin Scorsese, Daisy Ridley and Liam Neeson. It aired on Virgin Media One.

Below are the winners and nominees. Winners are at the top of each list, in bold type.

Film

Best film (2019)
Films released in 2018.
 Black ’47
 Float Like a Butterfly
 Rosie
 The Dig
 The Hole in the Ground

Best film (2020)
Films released in 2019. (Arracht went on general release in 2020, but it premiered at a festival in 2019.)
Ordinary Love
A Bump Along the Way
Arracht
Calm with Horses
Extra Ordinary

Director
Paddy Breathnach – Rosie
Nora Twomey – The Breadwinner
Lance Daly – Black ’47
Tomás Ó Súilleabháin – Arracht 
Mike Ahern and Enda Loughman – Extra Ordinary
Lee Cronin – The Hole in the Ground
Lisa Barros D'Sa and Glenn Leyburn – Ordinary Love

Script 
 Mark O'Halloran – Rialto
Roddy Doyle – Rosie
Owen McCafferty – Ordinary Love
 Joe Murtagh – Calm with Horses
Tomás Ó Súilleabháin – Arracht 
 Carmel Winters – Float Like a Butterfly

Actress in a leading role
Jessie Buckley – Wild Rose
 Aisling Franciosi – The Nightingale
 Bronagh Gallagher – A Bump Along The Way
Sarah Greene – Rosie
Seána Kerslake – The Hole in the Ground
Saoirse Ronan – Little Women

Actor in a leading role
Tom Vaughan-Lawlor – Rialto
 Dara Devaney – Finky
Moe Dunford – The Dig
Liam Neeson – Ordinary Love
Dónall Ó Héalaí – Arracht
Barry Ward – Extra Ordinary

Actress in a supporting role

 Niamh Algar – Calm With Horses
 Caitriona Balfe – Le Mans '66 (Ford v Ferrari)
 Seána Kerslake – Dublin Oldschool
 Charlie Murphy – Dark Lies the Island
Emily Taaffe – The Dig
Catherine Walker – We Ourselves

Actor in a supporting role

David Wilmot – Ordinary Love
Lorcan Cranitch – The Dig
 Dara Devaney – Arracht
 Barry Keoghan – Calm With Horses
 Ian Lloyd Anderson – Dublin Oldschool
 Stephen Rea – Black ’47

George Morrison Feature Documentary

The Lonely Battle of Thomas Reid
 Gaza
 I, Dolours
 Katie
 The Image You Missed
When All is Ruin Once Again

Short film – Live action

 Welcome To A Bright White Limbo
 Bainne
 Ciúnas (Silence)
 Detainment
 El Hor
 Here’s Looking at you Kid!
 Inhale
 Sister This
 The Grass Ceiling
 The Vasectomy Doctor

Animated short 

The Dream Report
 Outside the Box
 Streets of Fury
 The Bird & the Whale
The Overcoat

Irish Film Board Rising Star Award
Aisling Franciosi
Niamh Algar
Andy & Ryan Tohill (The Dig)
Lee Cronin

Television drama

Drama

 Blood (Channel 5 / Virgin Media One)
 Death and Nightingales (RTÉ / BBC)
 Dublin Murders (RTÉ / BBC)
 Vikings (History [Canada])

Director
Dearbhla Walsh – The Handmaid’s Tale
Anthony Byrne – Peaky Blinders
John Hayes – Dublin Murders
Lisa Mulcahy – Blood
Hannah Quinn – Blood
Aisling Walsh – Elizabeth Is Missing

Script
Mark O'Rowe – Temple
Ronan Bennett – Top Boy
Daragh Carville – The Bay
Mark O'Connor – Darklands

Actress in a leading role
 Niamh Algar – The Virtues
Caitriona Balfe – Outlander
Jessie Buckley – The Woman in White
Sarah Greene – Dublin Murders
Ruth Negga – Preacher
Ann Skelly – Death and Nightingales

Actor in a leading role
Andrew Scott – Black Mirror ("Smithereens")
 Richard Dormer – Fortitude
 Adrian Dunbar – Line Of Duty
 Brendan Gleeson – Mr. Mercedes
Cillian Murphy – Peaky Blinders
Chris O'Dowd – Get Shorty

Actress in a supporting role

Jessie Buckley – Chernobyl
 Niamh Algar – Pure
 Helen Behan – The Virtues
 Ruth Bradley – Guilt
 Ingrid Craigie – Blood
 Fiona Shaw – Killing Eve

Actor in a supporting role
Mark O'Halloran – The Virtues
Liam Cunningham – Game of Thrones
 Barry Keoghan – Chernobyl
 Owen McDonnell – Killing Eve
 Cillian O’Gairbhi – Blood
Tom Vaughan-Lawlor – Dublin Murders

Craft

Original music

 KÍLA – Arracht
 Stephen McKeon – The Hole in the Ground
 Stephen Rennicks – The Little Stranger
Brian Byrne – Black ’47 
Ray Harman – Blood
Stephen Rennicks – Rosie

Editing

Mick Mahon – Gaza
 Colin Campbell – The Hole in the Ground
Dermot Diskin – Never Grow Old
 Michael Harte – Three Identical Strangers
Tony Kearns – Black Mirror: Bandersnatch
Úna Ní Dhonghaíle – Rosie

Production Design

 John Leslie – Never Grow Old
 Tom Conroy – The Rhythm Section
 Damien Creagh – Calm With Horses
 Conor Dennison – The Hole in the Ground
 Padraig O’Neil – Arracht
 Anna Rackard – The Trial of Christine Keeler

Cinematography

Piers McGrail – Never Grow Old
 Tom Comerford – The Hole in the Ground
 Andrew McConnel – Gaza
 Kate McCullough – Arracht
Robbie Ryan – Marriage Story 
Cathal Watters – Rosie

Costume Design

 Eimer Ní Mhaoldomhnaigh – The Rhythm Section
 Joan Bergin – The Catcher was a Spy
 Clodagh Deegan – Arracht
 Triona Lillis – Float Like A Butterfly
 Susan O’Connor Cave – Vikings
 Louise Stanton – Rosie

Makeup & Hair

Linda Gannon & Liz Byrne – Black ’47
 Niamh O’Loan – Arracht
Louise Myler – Finky
Polly McKay – Ordinary Love
Dee Corcoran & Tom McInerney – Vikings
Eileen Buggy & Jennifer Hegarty – Vita & Virginia

Sound

 Brendan Rehill, Alan Scully and Peter Blayney – Arracht
 Fionáin Higgins & Robert Flanagan – Black ’47
 Ronan Hill, Danny Crowley & Simon Kerr – Game of Thrones
 Aza Hand, Karen O’Mahony and Patrick Drummond – Never Grow Old
 Hugh Fox & Niall Brady – Rosie
 Steve Fanagan & Niall Brady – The Little Stranger

VFX

 Ed Bruce and Nicholas Murphy – We Have Always Lived in the Castle
 Jim O’Hagan and Ronan Gantly – Game of Thrones
 Ed Bruce – The Favourite
 Ed Bruce and Jim O’Hagan – The Irishman

References

External links
 Awards at the Irish Film and Television Academy official website

2020 in Irish television
16
2020 film awards
2020 television awards